The Association of Nene River Clubs (ANRC) is an association and umbrella organisation for waterway societies on the River Nene, England, UK. It liaises between the clubs and outside organisations, such as the Environment Agency and the Royal Yachting Association, and it is itself affiliated to the Association of Waterways Cruising Clubs. The association has its own burgee.

Member organisations

Elton Boat Club
Middle Level Watermen's Club
Middle Nene Sailing Club
Northampton Boat Club
Oundle Cruising Club
Peterborough Cruising Club
Peterborough Yacht Club
Stanground Boating Association

As of January 2015 the Committee of Middle Nene Cruising Club severed its links with the ANRC and is no longer an affiliated ANRC club, however many of its members remain as individual members.

The association is a founding member of the "Cambridgeshire Boatwatch Scheme", in cooperation with Cambridgeshire Police, the Environment Agency, and the Great Ouse Boating Association.

See also

List of waterway societies in the United Kingdom

References

External links
Association of Nene River Clubs

Waterways organisations in England
Clubs and societies in Norfolk
River Nene